Manuela Aguilera is a Spanish Paralympic swimmer. She won three medals at the 1984 New York and Stoke Mandeville Paralympics.

Career 
At the 1984 Summer Paralympics, she won a gold medal in the 100 meters backstroke L6, and 200 meters individual medley L6. She won a silver medal in the 100 meters freestyle L6.

References 

Living people
Paralympic swimmers of Spain
Spanish female freestyle swimmers
Spanish female backstroke swimmers
Spanish female medley swimmers
Paralympic gold medalists for Spain
Paralympic silver medalists for Spain
Swimmers at the 1984 Summer Paralympics
Medalists at the 1984 Summer Paralympics
Year of birth missing (living people)
Place of birth missing (living people)